Vila Maria is a district located in the northern region of the city of São Paulo. A good part of the economy of the district comes from activities related to logistics and transportation of cargoes due to the large number of companies in the industry located in the region. The neighborhood is also famous for the samba school of the Unidos da Vila Maria.

Districts of São Paulo

war:Vila Maria